Steenson is a surname and may refer to:

Brian Steenson, former Grand Prix motorcycle road racer
Gareth Steenson (born 1984), currently a Fly-half for Exeter Chiefs
Gerard Steenson (1957–1987), Irish republican paramilitary in the Irish National Liberation Army (INLA) during the Troubles in Northern Ireland
Jeffrey N. Steenson PA (born 1952), American prelate of the Roman Catholic Church, the first ordinary of the Personal Ordinariate of the Chair of Saint Peter
Molly Wright Steenson (born 1971), American professor of design and historian of architecture and technology
Willie Steenson, a blind fiddler in Redgauntlet (1824), a historical novel by Sir Walter Scott

See also
Steens (disambiguation)
Stenson
Stevenstone